Angela Franziska Johanna Hammitzsch (née Hitler; 28 July 1883 – 30 October 1949) was the elder half-sister of Adolf Hitler. She was the mother of Geli Raubal by her first husband, Leo Raubal Sr.

Life 
Angela Hitler was born in Braunau, Austria-Hungary, the second child of Alois Hitler Sr. and his second wife, Franziska Matzelsberger. Her mother died the following year. She and her brother Alois Hitler, Jr. were brought up by their father and his third wife Klara Pölzl. Her half-brother, Adolf Hitler, was born six years after her, and they grew very close. She is the only one of his siblings mentioned in Mein Kampf.

Angela's father died in 1903 and her stepmother died in 1907, leaving a small inheritance. On 14 September 1903, she married Leo Raubal (11 June 1879 – 10 August 1910), a junior tax inspector, and gave birth to a son, Leo on 12 October 1906. On 4 June 1908, Angela gave birth to Geli and in 1910 to a second daughter, Elfriede (Elfriede Maria Hochegger, 10 January 1910 – 24 September 1993). Her husband died in 1910.

Widow
She moved to Vienna after World War I. Walter Langer's wartime report The Mind of Adolf Hitler, an OSS profile of the Hitler family, paints a positive picture of Angela at this period, describing her as "rather a decent and industrious person". It says she became manager of Mensa Academia Judaica, a boarding house for Jewish students, where she once defended those in her care against anti-Semitic rioters. According to Langer: "Some of our informants knew her during this time and report that in the student riots Angela defended the Jewish students from attack and on several occasions beat the Aryan students away from the steps of the dining hall with a club. She is a rather large, strong peasant type of person who is well able to take an active part."

Angela had heard nothing from Adolf for a decade when he re-established contact with her in 1919. In 1924, Adolf was confined in Landsberg; Angela made the trip from Vienna to visit him. In 1928, she and Geli moved to the Haus Wachenfeld at Obersalzberg near Berchtesgaden, where she became his housekeeper and was later put in charge of the household at Hitler's expanded retreat. Geli committed suicide in 1931.

Angela continued to work for her half-brother following  Geli's death, but she strongly disapproved of Hitler's relationship with Eva Braun. She eventually left Berchtesgaden as a result and moved to Dresden.

Remarriage
On 18 February 1936, she married architect Professor Martin Hammitzsch (22 May 1878 – 12 May 1945), who designed the Yenidze cigarette factory in Dresden, and who later became the Director of the State School of Building Construction in Dresden. 

On 26 June 1936, the couple returned to Passau. When they visited the house at the Inn river, where Angela had lived as a child, they left an entry at the visitors' book, and the local newspaper reported.

Hitler apparently disapproved of the marriage, and referred to his half-sister as "Frau Hammitzsch". It seems, however, that Hitler re-established contact with her during World War II, because Angela remained his intermediary to the rest of the family with whom he did not want any contact. In 1941, she sold her memoirs of her years with Hitler to the Eher-Verlag, which brought her .

In spring 1945, after the destruction of Dresden in the massive air raid of February 13-14, Adolf Hitler moved Angela to Berchtesgaden to avoid her being captured by the Soviets. In Hitler's Last Will and Testament, he guaranteed Angela a pension of  monthly from his personal wealth bequeathed to the German state. It is uncertain if she ever received any payments because Hitler's Swiss bank account was frozen until the 1990s and much of the money was seized by the American government. Her second husband committed suicide shortly after the final defeat of Germany.

Post-war
Adolf apparently had a low opinion of the intelligence of both his sisters, calling them "stupid geese". Nevertheless, she spoke very highly of him, even after the war, and claimed that neither her brother nor she herself had known anything about the Holocaust. Angela Hitler died of a stroke on 30 October 1949 in Hanover.

Family
Her son, Leo, had a son – Peter (b. 1931), a retired engineer who lives in Linz, Austria. Angela's daughter Elfriede married German lawyer Ernst Hochegger on 27 June 1937 in Düsseldorf; they had a son, Heiner Hochegger (born in January 1945).

Film portrayals 
She is played by Helene Thimig in the movie The Hitler Gang (1944). In the miniseries Hitler: The Rise of Evil (2003), she is portrayed by Julie-Ann Hassett.

In the French comedy L'as des as (1982), Angela Hitler is portrayed as the caretaker of Hitler's Obersalzberg residence. She is played in drag by Günter Meisner, the same actor who plays Hitler.

See also 
 Hitler family

References

Sources 
  "De jeugd van Adolf Hitler 1889-1907 en zijn familie en voorouders" by Marc Vermeeren. Soesterberg, 2007, 420 blz. Uitgeverij Aspekt, 

1883 births
1949 deaths
People from Braunau am Inn
Angela